York Castle High School is a co-educational secondary school in Jamaica. The school has educated some of the region's best leaders and it continues to play a pivotal role in Jamaica's development.

History
On a hill side property by the name of Egypt in North-West St. Ann is a high school named "York Castle", tucked away for the past 52 years and responsible for some of Jamaica's most prominent scholars. York Castle High School has a rich history and roots dating back as far as 1875.

In that year, the Methodist Church purchased a property named York Castle near Alderton, where they established a Theological College in 1876. In 1896, York Castle closed its doors due to financial difficulties. Despite this closure, the need for education in the area remained a constant challenge to men of vision who embraced the idea which has originally led to the founding of York Castle in 1876. Before the closure, Mr. T. Bramwell had in 1903 set up a Middlesex High School in Brown's Town. Mr. Bramwell served as principal for over 40 years. After his death, Middlesex High School was renamed Henderson High School in 1947, after a Baptist minister - Rev. George Henderson. Henderson high school closed its doors in 1954.

By this time, the idea of continuing the principle of education found custody in the hands of concerned citizens who renamed the school Northside in 1955.

At the synod of the Methodist Church in 1946, there was a resolution asking the church to recognize its obligation to establish a school for boys, or possibly a coeducational school to be called "York Castle". A committee was set up which was entrusted with the task of establishing a new school in St. Ann. This committee contemplated a site for this new school. On November 30, 1956, the committee, consisting of educators, churchmen and others met and considered an offer from Northside secondary school that the school be handed over to the Methodist Church. The offer was accepted. with a proposed loan from the Methodist Church and gifts from past students of the former York Castle and the sale of the property which the former York Castle was sited, it was agreed that as of January 1, 1957 the Methodist Church would assume control over Northside Secondary School. the Egypt site was decided on in March 1957 and the stone laying ceremony took place on May 16, 1957. By August, the school was given a full ministerial recognition as a secondary grant aided school now bearing the name York Castle High School.

On January 7, 1958, the new school building was opened with 195 day students and 40 boarders. In February, the official opening of the building was done by the Hon. N.W. Manley, Premier of Jamaica.

School crest

The book in the upper left hand corner of the crest bears the words, "Gloria Deo", meaning Glory be to God.

Schools Challenge Quiz
In 1972, York Castle High School was the winner of Jamaica Broadcasting Corporation (JBC, now TVJ) Schools Challenge Quiz competition in Jamaica. Team members were Omar Brown (captain), James Walsh, Lorence Brown and Lawrence Alexander. The team was coached by Ms Jackie Vernon (now Mrs. Jackie Bertram).  York Castle High School holds the following records in the Schools Challenge Quiz competition: 
The first Coed school to win Schools Challenge Quiz.
The first rural area school to win quiz.
The only school in St. Ann to win quiz.

National Secondary School Debating Competition
In 2015, York Castle High School championed the Burger King's National Secondary Schools Debating Competition over 30 different high schools across the island. Winning St. Mary High School in the heated finals of the competition. The team members were Danmar Clarke (captain), Kadijah Cox, Micheal Miller and Bobby Francis. The team was coached by Mrs. Nickashie Chin-Hardware and ms. D. Clarke.

Public Speaking Competition
In February 2016, York Castle High School championed the Rita Marley Foundation Public Speaking competition over 10 top high schools across the island, beating Glenmuir High School and Haile Selassie High School in the heated finals of the competition. The group of over 25 students supported the Public Speaking Champion 14 years old Bobby Francis. Bobby Francis was coached by Mrs. H. Mears-Griffths and Mr. Adam-Clay Webb. York Castle High School holds the following National records:
 Presenting the youngest participant to enter and win competition.
 Only school in St. Ann to win a Public Speaking Competition.

Curriculum 
Subjects offered to students at the CSEC level include Agricultural Science, Biology, Building Technology, Caribbean History, Chemistry, Clothing & Textiles, Electronic Document Preparation & Management, English A, English B, Food & Nutrition, Geography, Home Economics Management, Human & Social Biology, Industrial Technology, Information Technology, Integrated Science, Mathematics, Mechanical Engineering Technology(starting soon), Music, Office Administration, Physical Education & Sport, Physics, Principles of Account, Principles of Business, Religious Education, Social Studies, Spanish, Technical Drawing, Visual Arts and French.

The School Song 
York Castle High Reach for the Sky

Like a Pyramid upon the plains of Egypt
Dominating the whole countryside
Your future can be what you make it
Success will come once you have tried

York Castle High, reach for the sky
Be the best you can be
It's a part of your destiny (repeat x1)

Like a seed growing out of the ashes
Like a shoot from the stark of a tree
Keep believing that you have a future
Think how bright your tomorrow can be

York Castle High, reach for the sky
Be the best you can be
It's a part of your destiny (repeat x1)

Let us give thanks unto the almighty
Who has helped men to labour within
And who gave us the determination
To enter, to fight and to win.''

York Castle High, reach for the sky
Be the best you can be
It's a part of your destiny (repeat x1)

We will go forth across every nation
But you will have a place in our heart
We'll reflect and give consideration
And remember you gave us a start.

York Castle High, reach for the sky
Be the best you can be
It's a part of your destiny (repeat x1)

Principals

Houses 
There are four houses at York Castle High:

Bramwell - Green
Henderson - Blue
Curphey - Yellow
Murray - Red

Schools in Jamaica
Buildings and structures in Saint Ann Parish